The 2008 Penn State Nittany Lions football team represented the Pennsylvania State University in the 2008 NCAA Division I FBS football season. The team was coached by Joe Paterno and played its home games in Beaver Stadium in University Park, Pennsylvania.

Previous season
The 2007 season began with the Nittany Lions ranked No. 17 in the AP and No. 18 in the Coaches' preseason polls, ranked as high as No. 10 at one point. The team dropped out of the rankings with back to back losses to Michigan and Illinois, regained a poll ranking after consecutive blowouts, then dropped out of the polls again after losing to Ohio State, but finished the season ranked No. 25 in the Coaches Poll with a final record of 9–4, including a victory over the Texas A&M Aggies in the 2007 Alamo Bowl.

Preseason
Prior to the end of the previous season, linebacker Sean Lee announced his plans to return for his senior season. However, Lee tore his anterior cruciate ligament in his right knee during practice and was sidelined for the entire season. Lee used his available redshirt and plans to return in 2009.

In January, junior cornerback Justin King announced that he was going to declare for the 2008 NFL Draft, skipping his final year of eligibility. King had graduated the previous semester with a degree in liberal arts with an emphasis in sports management. According to King's stepfather and high school coach, "He wanted to get an education and a degree from Penn State, which he did. He wanted to help turn Penn State around, and he did that, too."

Despite the injury, Lee was named one of the team's captains for 2008. Also elected captains by their teammates were center A. Q. Shipley, receiver Derrick Williams, safety Anthony Scirrotto and defensive end Josh Gaines. All five are seniors.

Recruiting class
The Nittany Lions received 14 letters of intent on National Signing Day, February 6, 2008.

Spring practice
A record crowd of 73,000 fans attended the annual Blue-White scrimmage at Beaver Stadium on April 19, surpassing the previous year's record of 71,000. The Blue squad won 27–14. Redshirt freshman running back Stephfon Green opened up the scoring for White, taking his first handoff 57 yards for a touchdown. Green finished the game with 87 yards on 12 carries, a 7.2 yard per carry average. Tight end Andrew Szczerba was the game's leading receiver, catching five passes for 65 yards in the first half.

In the quarterback competition, both Daryll Clark and Pat Devlin rotated between the first, second and third teams. Overall, Clark finished 9 of 16 for 106 yards and two scores, including a 33-yard touchdown pass to Derrick Williams. Devlin was 12 of 18 for 122 yards and a 22-yard touchdown pass to backup receiver Graham Zug.

On defense, sophomore Aaron Maybin tied for a game-high six tackles, including 3.5 sacks for the White team. Sophomore Ollie Ogbu led the Blue with six tackles and two sacks. Redshirt freshman linebacker Nate Stupar also had six tackles. Sophomore linebacker Chris Colasanti had four stops and forced and recovered a fumble.

Suspensions
Five players were suspended prior to spring drills for their involvement in an October 7 fight at the HUB-Robeson Center during the previous season, including defensive tackle Chris Baker, linebacker NaVorro Bowman, defensive back Knowledge Timmons, defensive tackle Phil Taylor, and receiver Chris Bell. Tight end Andrew Quarless became the sixth player suspended after a DUI incident in March. Bell was later kicked off the team after brandishing a knife at a teammate.

Following spring practice, Baker, Bowman, Quarless, Timmons and Taylor were allowed to rejoin and work out with the team. Baker was sentenced to two years probation.

ESPN's Outside the Lines aired a story on the legal troubles of the Penn State football team on July 27, 2008. The story detailed the increased number of PSU football players that have been arrested during the past few years. Among the statistics presented in the story was that 46 different players since 2002 have been charged with a combined 163 counts that have resulted in 27 players pleading guilty to 45 crimes. Three days after the story aired, Paterno dismissed Baker and Taylor, apparently after another off-campus incident.

Pre-season awards

 Jeremy Boone
First-team Athlon Sports pre-season All-Big Ten
First-team College Football News pre-season All-Big Ten
Deon Butler
Third-team Athlon Sports pre-season All-Big Ten
Maurice Evans
First-team Athlon Sports pre-season All-American
Sports Illustrated pre-season All-American
First-team College Football News pre-season All-American
First-team College Football News pre-season All-Big Ten
Josh Gaines
Third-team Athlon Sports pre-season All-Big Ten
Kevin Kelly
Second-team Athlon Sports pre-season All-Big Ten
Second-team College Football News pre-season All-Big Ten
Rich Ohrnberger
First-team Athlon Sports pre-season All-Big Ten
Second-team College Football News pre-season All-Big Ten
Lydell Sargeant
Second-team Athlon Sports pre-season All-Big Ten
Anthony Scirrotto
Second-team Athlon Sports pre-season All-Big Ten
Second-team College Football News pre-season All-Big Ten
A. Q. Shipley
First-team Athlon Sports pre-season All-Big Ten
First-team College Football News pre-season All-Big Ten
A. J. Wallace
First-team Athlon Sports pre-season All-Big Ten (kick returner)
Third-team Athlon Sports pre-season All-Big Ten (cornerback)
First-team College Football News pre-season All-Big Ten
Derrick Williams
Third-team Athlon Sports pre-season All-Big Ten
Second-team College Football News pre-season All-Big Ten
 Stefen Wisniewski
First-team College Football News pre-season All-Big Ten

Schedule
Penn State did not play Big Ten teams Northwestern and Minnesota this year.

Roster

Coaching staff
 Joe Paterno – Head Coach
 Dick Anderson – Offensive Line (Guards and Centers)
 Tom Bradley – Defensive Coordinator and Cornerbacks
 Kermit Buggs – Safeties
 Galen Hall – Offensive Coordinator and Running Backs
 Larry Johnson, Sr. – Defensive Line
 Bill Kenney – Offensive Tackles and Tight Ends
 Mike McQueary – Wide Receivers and Recruiting Coordinator
 Jay Paterno – Quarterbacks
 Ron Vanderlinden – Linebackers
 John Thomas – Strength and Conditioning

Game summaries

August 30: Coastal Carolina

Sophomore tailback Evan Royster ran for three touchdowns and 64 yards on eight carries, and redshirt freshman Stephfon Green gained 89 yards on ten carries including two scores to help the Nittany Lions defeat the Chanticleers of Coastal Carolina 66–10. Penn State has won seven straight season openers. After Trent Usher provided the Chanticleers' lone touchdown on a 33-yard reception to cut Penn State's lead to 14–7 early in the second quarter, Derrick Williams scored on an 89-yard kickoff return en route to a 38–7 halftime lead.

Many reserves saw action in the second half, including Chaz Powell's 55-yard touchdown run, and freshman Brandon Beachum's 1-yard touchdown run in the fourth quarter for the Nittany Lions' final touchdown. After Darryl Clark and Pat Devlin split quarterback duties in the first three quarters, Penn State subbed in Paul Cianciolo for the 4th. Coastal Carolina kicked a field goal as time expired for the final score.

Defensively for Penn State, Tyrell Sales led the defense with seven tackles, while Aaron Maybin had two sacks. Bani Gbadyu snagged his first career interception. Twenty-eight Nittany Lions recorded at least one tackle.

The win tied Joe Paterno with Florida State's Bobby Bowden atop the career wins list among major college coaches with his 373rd win.

September 6: Oregon State

In the week leading up to the game, a campus police search turned up a small amount of marijuana in an on-campus apartment home to defensive end Maurice Evans, defensive tackle Abe Koroma, tight end Andrew Quarless and cornerback A. J. Wallace. Coach Paterno later announced that Evans, Koroma and Quarless would not play against Oregon State. Wallace was allowed to return to practice, according to Paterno, "Wallace was not part of that." In an unrelated incident, cornerback Willie Harriott was dismissed from the team.

Despite the off-field distractions, the Nittany Lions rolled to a 35–7 halftime lead en route to a 45–14 win in their first ever meeting with the Beavers. Sophomore tailback Evan Royster ran for a career-high 141 yards on seventeen carries and three touchdowns. Daryll Clark's 276 total yards of offense (215 yards passing, 61 yards rushing) helped Penn State total 454 yards of offense.

Linebackers Tyrell Sales and NaVorro Bowman both recorded ten tackles each, both career-highs. Linebacker Josh Hull and safety Mark Rubin both made their first career interceptions. Junior defensive end Jerome Hayes, making his first career start in place of the suspended Evans, was lost for the remainder of the season with a torn ACL in his left knee. Hayes missed the latter half of the 2007 season with a torn ACL in his right knee.

For his performance, Royster was named Big Ten Co-Offensive Player of the Week.

September 13: Syracuse

The Nittany Lions defeated their old rivals 55–13 in their first meeting since the series was last played in 1990. Each of Penn State's three quarterbacks threw touchdown passes. Daryll Clark finished 10 of 21 for 163 yards and two touchdowns, Pat Devlin was 8 of 13 for 130 yards and two touchdowns, and Paul Cianciolo was 2 of 4 for 51 yards and a score. Receivers Jordan Norwood and Deon Butler both had over 100 yards receiving and two touchdowns apiece. Kevin Kelly kicked a 52-yard field goal just before halftime, the second-longest of his career, and backup kicker Collin Wagner kicked a 43-yard field goal late in the third quarter, his first career field goal.

The Nittany Lion defense held the Orange offense without a first down until early in the second quarter.

September 20: Temple

After a scoreless first quarter, the Nittany Lions scored three touchdowns in the first six minutes of the second quarter en route to a 31–0 halftime lead. The Penn State defense held the Owls to only 138 yards of total offense, including only 16 yards on the ground. In contrast, the Nittany Lions totaled 546 of offense, highlighted by Stephfon Green's 132 rushing yards including a 69-yard touchdown.

Sophomore linebacker NaVorro Bowman, in his first start, recorded eleven tackles, including five tackles for loss and three sacks, a forced fumble and an interception. Bowman was named Big Ten Co-Defensive Player of the Week.

The win, combined with Florida State's loss to Wake Forest, gave Paterno sole possession of the career record for most wins by a Division I FBS coach.

September 27: Illinois

The Nittany Lions defeated the Fighting Illini 38–24 in a nationally televised, prime time, "White Out" game, earning their first win over a ranked opponent this season and their first victory over a ranked opponent in a conference opener since joining the Big Ten. Illinois jumped out to a 14–7 lead, becoming the first team to take a lead on the Nittany Lions and the first to score points against them in the first quarter this season. However, the Nittany Lions responded with two touchdowns en route to a 21–14 halftime lead. The Illini wouldn't score again until kicking a field goal on the final play of the third quarter after recovering a Stephfon Green fumble, but Derrick Williams returned the ensuing kickoff for a touchdown. Penn State was 4 of 4 in the red zone and was penalized only once for 10 yards.

The Illini's 24 points were the most allowed by Penn State this season as were their 189 total rushing yards.

Derrick Williams is the first player under Paterno to score a rushing, receiving, and a kick return touchdown in the same game. His career-high 241 all-purpose yards (33 rushing, 75 receiving and 133 on kick returns) are the most by a Nittany Lion since Larry Johnson gained 289 yards versus Michigan State in 2002. Williams was selected the Big Ten Special Teams Player of the Week.

October 4: Purdue

Penn State defeated the Boilermakers 20–6 in their last matchup against Purdue coach Joe Tiller, who is retiring after this season. The Nittany Lions outgained Purdue 422 to 241 in total offense.

Daryll Clark completed 18 of 26 passes for 226 yards and a ran for a touchdown—a quarterback sneak on 4th-and-goal in the second quarter for the first points of the game. Running back Evan Royster ran for 141 yards and a touchdown and also caught four passes for 53 yards.

Purdue quarterback Curtis Painter finished 13 of 22 for 112 yards but was replaced by backup Joey Elliott after throwing an interception to Nittany Lions safety Drew Astorino. Purdue kicker Chris Summers missed all three of his kick attempts—two field goal attempts and an extra point attempt. Running back Kory Sheets' fourth-quarter touchdown on Purdue's last possession of the game was Purdue's first offensive touchdown against Penn State since 2005.

October 11: Wisconsin

Daryll Clark ran for two touchdowns and threw for one to Deon Butler in Penn State's 48–7 win over the Badgers in Camp Randall Stadium, handing them their worst home loss since 1989. Derrick Williams returned a punt for a touchdown, Evan Royster and backup quarterback Pat Devlin scored touchdowns on short runs, and Kevin Kelly kicked two field goals for the Nittany Lions. Penn State was penalized only once for 10 yards.

Clark was 16 of 25 passing for a career-high 244 yards and a touchdown, and also ran for a pair of scores for the first time in his career. He was named Big Ten's Offensive Player of the Week.

Defensive end Aaron Maybin, making only his fifth career start, was named Big Ten's Co-Defensive Player of the Week. Maybin recorded six tackles, a career-high 3.5 tackles-for-loss, a sack, two forced fumbles and a pass break-up. Maybin also stripped Badgers quarterback Allen Evridge late in the first half deep in Badgers territory, which was recovered by linebacker Josh Hull. Lydell Sargeant intercepted two passes, his first interceptions of the season.

October 18: Michigan

In front of the fourth-largest crowd in Beaver Stadium history, the Nittany Lions ended a nine-game losing streak to the Wolverines, dating back to 1997. Michigan tallied 204 yards of offense and scored on their first three possessions to take a 17–7 lead early in the second quarter. Daryll Clark's touchdown pass to Jordan Norwood late in the first half cut Michigan's lead to 17–14. Despite trailing at halftime for the first time this season, the Nittany Lion offense would outscore the Wolverines 32–0 in the second half and the defense made key halftime adjustments to limit the Wolverines to only 87 yards the remainder of the game.

Clark finished 18 of 31 for 171 yards and a touchdown and also ran for 45 yards and two one-yard touchdowns, but lost a fumble on Penn State's second drive which led to a Wolverine field goal. Evan Royster ran for a career-high 174 yards on eighteen carries for a 9.7 yard per carry average, including a 44-yard touchdown for Penn State's first points. Deon Butler had a season-high eight receptions for 105 yards, his fourth-career 100-yard game. Stephfon Green took a screen pass from Pat Devlin and outran the Wolverines defense 80 yards for the Nittany Lions' final score.

Linebacker NaVorro Bowman led the defense with eleven tackles. Defensive tackle Jared Odrick made a career-high six stops, with 2.5 tackles for loss, but his biggest play occurred with 4:39 remaining in the third quarter when he sacked Michigan quarterback Nick Sheridan, who was playing in place of the injured Steven Threet, in the end zone for a safety and Penn State's first lead of the game, 19–17. Aaron Maybin finished with four tackles, including a sack of Threet that forced a fumble, which was recovered by Abe Koroma and led to a Penn State touchdown.

Kicker Kevin Kelly made three field goals and five extra points to become the Big Ten's all-time leader in career kick scoring (376 career points) and was named the Big Ten's Special Teams Player of the Week. Odrick's sack for a safety was named the Pontiac Game Changing Performance of the Week.

October 25: Ohio State

For the fourth straight year, ESPN's College GameDay crew broadcast from the site of the Penn State–Ohio State match-up.

In front of an Ohio Stadium-record crowd of 105,711, the Nittany Lions got their first win at Ohio State since 1978 by defeating the Buckeyes 13–6 in a game where both offenses were held below their season averages. The turning point of the game occurred early in the fourth quarter with Ohio State holding a three-point lead and facing a 3rd-and-1. Safety Mark Rubin tackled Buckeyes quarterback Terrelle Pryor and forced a fumble recovered by linebacker NaVorro Bowman. Backup quarterback Pat Devlin, in for an injured Daryll Clark, scored on a quarterback sneak for the only touchdown of the game. After Kevin Kelly's second field goal, the Buckeyes last drive was ended with an interception by cornerback Lydell Sargeant at the goal line, Pryor's second turnover of the game. The Buckeyes were limited to their lowest point total in Ohio Stadium since 1982, and the Nittany Lions were charged with zero penalties.

Clark completed 12 of 20 passes for 121 yards before leaving. Devlin only attempted one pass, which drew a pass interference flag. Evan Royster had 77 yards on 19 carries. The Nittany Lions defense held the Buckeyes running game in check, holding Pryor to six yards on nine attempts, and Chris "Beanie" Wells to 55 yards on 22 carries. Rubin led the defense with a career-high eleven tackles and the forced fumble, and Bowman had ten tackles and the fumble recovery.

Rubin's forced fumble was voted the week's Pontiac Game Changing Performance with an overwhelming 53 percent of the total votes, and Rubin was named the Walter Camp Football Foundation Defensive Player of the Week and the Big Ten's Defensive Player of the Week. The team was named the Tostitos Fiesta Bowl National Team of the Week by the Football Writers Association of America.

Kelly's two field goals moved him into a first place tie for made field goals (72) in Big Ten history.

The win earned the seventh-largest regular season primetime audience ever on ABC. It was the second-highest of the 2008 college football season, drawing a larger audience than Game 3 of the 2008 World Series played on the same evening. Despite being an away game, thousands of Penn State students and fans rioted in the streets of State College following the game.

November 8: Iowa

Penn State was handed their only loss of the regular season when Iowa kicked a 31-yard field goal with :01 remaining to win the game, 24–23. Iowa began their game-winning drive at their own 15-yard line following a Tyler Sash interception of a Daryll Clark pass. It was only Clark's third interception of the year.

Derrick Williams was a multidimensional threat: taking several direct snaps from a variant of the Wildcat formation, rushing for 53 yards and a touchdown on twelve carries, and completing his first career pass (23 yards to tight end Mickey Shuler). Running back Evan Royster picked up 90 yards and a touchdown on a career-high twenty-six carries, becoming the 12th Nittany Lion to rush for 1,000 yards in a season. Receiver Deon Butler had three catches, moving him into a tie with Bobby Engram for the career receptions leader at Penn State (167). Kevin Kelly set the Big Ten record for career field goals with his 24-yarder in the first quarter, topping Mike Nugent's previous record of 72. Kelly has kicked field goals in a school-record 30 consecutive games.

Penn State's defense limited the Iowa offense to 272 yards and forced two turnovers but allowed the Hawkeyes to drive 41 yards and into field goal range on the game's final drive, aided by an Anthony Scirrotto pass interference call on 3rd-and-15.

November 15: Indiana

Penn State overcame a sluggish first half to preserve their perfect record over the Hoosiers with a 34–7 victory. The Nittany Lions overcame three Daryll Clark turnovers, who threw for 240 yards and two touchdowns. Receiver Deon Butler had five receptions for 56 yards and a touchdown, becoming Penn State's career receptions leader with 172, passing Bobby Engram (167). Derrick Williams accumulated 164 all-purpose yards, the second-highest total of his career. Williams ran for a career-high 61 yards on four carries, including a career-long 36-yard touchdown run in the fourth quarter. His 39-yard touchdown catch was his longest career reception.

The defense held Indiana to 180 yards of total offense and only six first downs, the fewest Penn State has ever allowed in a Big Ten game. Linebacker Josh Hull led all tacklers with seven, including his first career sack. The only points allowed came on a Marcus Thigpen 57-yard rushing touchdown in the second quarter to tie the game 7–7. Kevin Kelly later kicked a field goal to give the Lions a 10–7 lead at halftime. In the second half, the Nittany Lions defense would only give up 36 yards and one first down.

November 22: Michigan State

On Senior Day, the Nittany Lions clinched a Rose Bowl BCS bid and a share of the Big Ten championship with a 49–18 victory over the Spartans. In snowy weather conditions, Daryll Clark threw for career-highs of 341 yards and four touchdowns. The offensive line, led by seniors A. Q. Shipley, Gerald Cadogan, Mike Lucian and Rich Ohrnberger, and senior fullback Dan Lawlor paved the way for Penn State's 557 yards of total offense. Senior receiver Jordan Norwood had five receptions for a career-high 127 yards. Fellow senior Deon Butler tallied 133 yards on three receptions, all resulting in touchdowns.

Entering the game, Spartans running back Javon Ringer was third in the NCAA in rushing averaging 140.7 yards per game, but the Penn State defense held Ringer to a season-low 42 yards. Senior Mark Rubin led all Penn State tacklers with eight. Senior defensive backs Lydell Sargeant and Anthony Scirrotto each had one interception, with Scirrotto's leading to a Derrick Williams 32-yard touchdown on the next offensive play.

The win was the 800th in Penn State history. The Nittany Lions are the sixth school to reach 800 wins, joining Michigan (872), Notre Dame (830), Texas (830), Nebraska (815) and Ohio State (808).

Clark was named the Big Ten Co-Offensive Player of the Week.

January 1, 2009: USC (Rose Bowl)

For the first time since 2004, the Big Ten and Pac-10 champs met in the Rose Bowl. During the years in between, one or the other was in the BCS national championship. However, the last time USC and Penn State met in a bowl game, Penn State was still an independent.

After a close first quarter, USC scored 24 unanswered second quarter points en route to a 31–7 halftime lead. A possible fumble in Penn State's favor was negated by an offsides penalty and Stephon Green's fumble just before halftime led to the final USC touchdown. The second half was more in Penn State's favor. USC continued their pass-heavy gameplan, but Penn State adjusted and was able to outscore USC 17–7 in the second half. Penn State cut the lead to 38–24 with 4 and 1/2 minutes left, but their first attempt to cut further into the lead was immediately intercepted. However, USC's next punt went sailing over the punter and Penn State recovered, giving Penn State the ball at the USC 14, but it was also intercepted. With the loss, Penn State moved to 1–2 in Rose Bowls and 1–1 under Joe Paterno.

After taking over for an injured Evan Royster in the second quarter, backup tailback Stephfon Green finished with 57 yards on 10 carries and was the Nittany Lions' leading receiver with five catches for 67 yards. Green left the game in the fourth quarter after sustaining what appeared to be a sprained right ankle. However, tests conducted after the team returned home revealed that Green sustained broken bones in his right leg and ankle and would require surgery to help repair the bones. Green is expected out of action for up to three months.

Rankings

Awards

Watchlists

Deon Butler
Fred Biletnikoff Award watchlist
Gerald Cadogan
Outland Trophy watchlist
Draddy Trophy semifinalist
Daryll Clark
Maxwell Award watchlist and semifinalist
Davey O'Brien Award semifinalist
Maurice Evans
Lombardi Award watchlist
Bronko Nagurski Trophy watchlist
Chuck Bednarik Award watchlist
Ted Hendricks Award watchlist
Kevin Kelly
Lou Groza Award watchlist and semifinalist
Aaron Maybin
Chuck Bednarik Award semifinalist and finalist
Walter Camp Player of the Year watchlist
Ted Hendricks Award mid-season watchlist and finalist
Joe Paterno
George Munger Award semifinalist
Liberty Mutual Coach of the Year Award finalist
Eddie Robinson Coach of the Year finalist
Evan Royster
Maxwell Award watchlist
Doak Walker Award semifinalist
A. Q. Shipley
Lombardi Award watchlist
Outland Trophy watchlist
Rimington Trophy watchlist and finalist
Derrick Williams
Maxwell Award watchlist
Fred Biletnikoff Award watchlist

Players

Jeremy Boone
ESPN The Magazine CoSIDA Academic All-District
NaVorro Bowman
First-team All-Big Ten
ESPN All-Big Ten
ESPN All-Bowl Team
Big Ten Defensive Player of the Week (September 20)
Phil Steele's mid-season All-American
Deon Butler
Second-team All-Big Ten (conference media selection)
Gerald Cadogan
First-team All-Big Ten
Big Ten Sportsmanship Award
ESPN All-Big Ten
ESPN The Magazine CoSIDA Academic All-District
First-team ESPN The Magazine CoSIDA Academic All-American
Daryll Clark
First-team All-Big Ten
ESPN All-Big Ten
Big Ten Offensive Player of the Week (October 11)
Big Ten Offensive Player of the Week (November 22)
Pat Devlin
ESPN The Magazine CoSIDA Academic All-District
Josh Hull
ESPN The Magazine CoSIDA Academic All-District
First-team ESPN The Magazine CoSIDA Academic All-American
Kevin Kelly
First-team All-Big Ten
Big Ten Special Teams Player of the Week (Oct. 18)
Aaron Maybin
First-team Walter Camp All-American
FWAA All-American
First-team Associated Press All-American
CBS Sports All-American
Second-team Sports Illustrated All-American
Second-team Sporting News All-American
Third-team Rivals.com All-American
First-team All-Big Ten
ESPN All-Big Ten
Big Ten Defensive Player of the Week (Oct. 11)
Sports Illustrated mid-season All-American
College Football News mid-season All-American
CBS Sports mid-season All-American
Phil Steele's mid-season All-American
Pigskin Club of Washington, D.C. National Defensive Player of the Year
 Jared Odrick
First-team All-Big Ten (conference coaches selection)
ESPN/Pontiac Game Changing Performance (Oct. 18)
 Rich Ohrnberger
Third-team Associated Press All-American
First-team All-Big Ten
ESPN All-Big Ten
 Andrew Pitz
ESPN The Magazine CoSIDA Academic All-District
First-team ESPN The Magazine CoSIDA Academic All-American
Evan Royster
Second-team All-Big Ten
Big Ten Offensive Player of the Week (September 6)
Mark Rubin
Walter Camp Defensive Player of the Week (Oct. 25)
ESPN The Magazine CoSIDA Academic All-District
First-team ESPN The Magazine CoSIDA Academic All-American
Big Ten Defensive Player of the Week (Oct. 25)
ESPN/Pontiac Game Changing Performance (Oct. 25)
 Lydell Sargeant
Second-team All-Big Ten (conference media selection)
Anthony Scirrotto
Third-team Rivals.com All-American
First-team All-Big Ten (conference coaches selection)
A. Q. Shipley
2008 Rimington Trophy winner
First-team Walter Camp All-American
FWAA All-American
ESPN All-American
CBS Sports All-American
Second-team Associated Press All-American
Second-team Sports Illustrated All-American
Third-team Rivals.com All-American
First-team All-Big Ten
Big Ten Offensive Lineman of the Year
ESPN All-Big Ten
Sports Illustrated mid-season All-American
College Football News mid-season All-American
CBS Sports mid-season All-American
Phil Steele's mid-season All-American
Derrick Williams
Second-team Walter Camp All-American
Third-team Associated Press All-American
Second-team Sporting News All-American
Second-team Rivals.com All-American
First-team All-Big Ten (conference coaches selection)
ESPN All-Big Ten
Big Ten Special Teams Player of the Week (Sep. 27)
Sports Illustrated mid-season All-American
College Football News mid-season All-American
CBS Sports mid-season All-American
Sporting News Today mid-season All-American
Phil Steele's mid-season All-American
 Stefen Wisniewski
Second-team All-Big Ten (conference coaches selection)
ESPN The Magazine CoSIDA Academic All-District
Second-team ESPN The Magazine CoSIDA Academic All-American

Coaches
Joe Paterno
Dave McClain Big Ten Coach of the Year

Other awards
2008 Lambert Trophy winner
FWAA Tostitos Fiesta Bowl National Team of the Week (October 25)

Post season
Penn State finished the season ranked number 8 in both the final AP and Coaches college football polls, earning Penn State its 22nd Top 10 finish under Joe Paterno. It's the 34th final top 25 ranking under Paterno.

Penn State finished second in football attendance for the sixth time this decade and in the top four for the 18th consecutive year, averaging 108,254 for seven home games, including crowds of 110,017 on homecoming to watch Penn State host Michigan, the fourth-largest in Beaver Stadium history, and 109,845  to watch Penn State beat Michigan State and clinch the Big Ten title, the seventh-largest in Beaver Stadium history.

In December, backup quarterback Pat Devlin decided to transfer from Penn State and would not play in the Rose Bowl. Devlin appeared in ten games for the Nittany Lions, passing for 459 yards, four touchdowns and no interceptions. Devlin later committed to Delaware, a Division I FCS school, where he will have two years of eligibility left.

In January, redshirt sophomore defensive end Aaron Maybin announced that he was skipping his final two seasons of eligibility and declared for the 2009 NFL Draft. Junior defensive end Maurice Evans, despite losing his starting position and playing time to Maybin due to a three-game suspension for marijuana possession, also declared for the draft.

After the Rose Bowl, defensive line coach Larry Johnson, Sr. interviewed with Illinois head coach Ron Zook to become the Illini's defensive coordinator. While many anticipated Johnson to take the job, in the end Johnson decided to stay at his current position at Penn State.

Eight players were invited to the NFL Scouting Combine, held February 18–24 in Indianapolis: Deon Butler, Gerald Cadogan, Maurice Evans, Aaron Maybin, Jordan Norwood, Lydell Sargeant, A. Q. Shipley and Derrick Williams.

NFL draft
Five Penn State players were selected in the 2009 NFL Draft.

Along with the five players selected in the 2009 NFL Draft, nine other players have signed with NFL teams.

All-star games

References

Penn State
Penn State Nittany Lions football seasons
Lambert-Meadowlands Trophy seasons
Penn State Nittany Lions football